David Alan Johnson (born May 29, 1964) is an American rifle shooter who won a gold medal in the 10 m air rifle at the 1991 Pan American Games. Next year he competed at the same event at the 1992 Olympics and finished in 11th place.

Johnson started training in shooting in 1972 at the Langley Junior rifle club in Virginia, and continued through his graduation from Hampton High School in 1982. In 1986, he earned a Bachelor of Science degree in finance from West Virginia University. After graduation, he joined the U.S. Army Reserves and became a member of the marksmanship unit. Since early 2000s he trained the National Rifle Team, preparing it for the 2004, 2008 and 2012 Olympics.

References

References

1964 births
Living people
20th-century American people
21st-century American people
American male sport shooters
American military Olympians
Hampton High School (Virginia) alumni
Olympic shooters of the United States
Shooters at the 1992 Summer Olympics
People from Mount Holly, New Jersey
Pan American Games gold medalists for the United States
Pan American Games silver medalists for the United States
Pan American Games medalists in shooting
Shooters at the 1983 Pan American Games
Shooters at the 1991 Pan American Games
Shooters at the 1995 Pan American Games
Medalists at the 1983 Pan American Games
Medalists at the 1991 Pan American Games
Medalists at the 1995 Pan American Games
United States Army reservists
United States Army officers